Ridgeview High School (RHS) was founded in 1994.

Academics
All students enrolled at RHS must at least meet the following criteria before graduation:
4 years of English (40 credits)
3 years of Social Studies (30 credits)
1 year of World History
1 year of U.S. History
1 year of U.S. Government/Economics
2 years of Math (20 credits)
All students must pass Algebra or an approved sequence of courses covering the Algebra standard (Ed. Code 51224.5) in grades 7–12.
2 years of Science. (20 credits)
1 year of Physical Science
1 year of Biological Science
2 years of P.E. (20 credits)
2 year of Foreign Language/Fine Arts (20 credits)
1 semester of Health (5 credits)
70 credits of electives
In total, 220 credits are necessary for a student at RHS to graduate.  Also, every student who graduates must pass the CAHSEE and an approved Algebra course.

Furthermore, RHS offers the following AP courses, which students can take to earn college credit, pass an SAT II exam, or be academically challenged:
AP Biology
AP Calculus AB
AP English Literature and Composition
AP Spanish Language
AP Statistics
AP U.S. Government
AP United States History
AP World History

RHS also participates in the national We the People: The Citizen and the Constitution program in the 23rd Congressional District. Their coach is Jason Jenkins. In 2018, RHS's Unit 1 won the school's first-ever first place ranking in the program. Ridgeview's We the People units also coordinate with those from West, coached by Angela Jenkins.

Athletics
The athletic director for RHS is Brad Harris.  RHS sports teams are called the Wolf Pack, and have their home games on campus.  The Wolf Pack participate in the South Yosemite League (Div. II, CIF Central Section) and have varsity, JV and Frosh/Soph teams.  Below are all the sports that RHS participates in and their respective season:

Fall
Cross Country
Football*
Women's Golf
Women's Tennis
Women's Volleyball
Cheerleading
Men's Water Polo
Women's Water Polo

Winter
Men's Basketball
Men's Soccer
Women's Basketball
Women's Soccer
Wrestling
Cheerleading

Spring
Baseball
Track and Field
Men's Golf
Men's Tennis
Softball
Swimming
Cheerleading

Notable alumni
Bryson Keeton - NFL cornerback
Erica McCall - WNBA center
Kamari Cotton-Moya - NFL defensive back
Rodney Leisle -NFL
Kyrie Wilson - NFL

Performing Arts Program
The drama program has won various awards for its Drama Performance (DP) class at local and regional competitions. In 2018, a group of students won first place for their ensemble Shakespeare scene (the induction scene from The Taming of the Shrew) at the Bakersfield College Shakespeare Festival. That same year, their Small Group Comedy scene (10 Reasons You Should Have Stayed Home Sick Today) won fourth place and their Large Group Comedy scene won third place at the DTASC fall festival. The drama department also hosts Bakersfield's original annual Dance Revue.

References

Educational institutions established in 1994
High schools in Bakersfield, California
Public high schools in California
1994 establishments in California